The Reconciliation Church is a Lutheran church on the Schandauerstraße / Wittenberger Straße 96 in Striesen, Dresden, Germany.

Sources 
 Ulrich Hübner et al.: Symbol und Wahrhaftigkeit. Reformbaukunst in Dresden. Verlag der Kunst Dresden Ingwert Paulsen jun., Husum 2005, 
 Gilbert Lupfer, Bernhard Sterra, Martin Wörner (eds.): Architekturführer Dresden. Dietrich Reimer Verlag, Berlin 1997,

External links 

 Website of the Kirchgemeinde Dresden-Blasewitz (owners of the Versöhnungskirche) 

Churches in Dresden